The women's lightweight quadruple sculls competition at the 2018 World Rowing Championships in Plovdiv took place at the Plovdiv Regatta Venue.

Schedule
The schedule was as follows:

All times are Eastern European Summer Time (UTC+3)

Results

Heats
Heat winners advanced directly to the final. The remaining boats were sent to the repechage.

Heat 1

Heat 2

Repechage
The four fastest boats advanced to the final. The remaining boat took no further part in the competition.

Final
The final determined the rankings.

References

2018 World Rowing Championships
World